Sandeep Chowta is an Indian music director who primarily works in Bollywood and Telugu cinema. He is also the head of Columbia Records in India. He has also sung some of his songs.

In 2003, he produced an anti substance abuse documentary, titled Dead End, which entered into numerous film festivals. This was produced by seventeen-year-old college student and drug activist, Tanya Khubchandani.

In 2004 Chowta invited Jay Oliver and Richard Gannaway of the world/new age musical group, AO Music (also known as AO), to his Mumbai studio, and has since become one of the group's core members. AO Music also features Miriam Stockley, the voice of Karl Jenkins' Adiemus project, and children's choral ensembles from around the globe. AO Music album releases crediting Chowta have charted in the top five internationally since 2009.

He has composed music for 12 Tollywood films.

Early life
Chowta was born in Ghana, grew up in Nigeria and later moved to Bangalore, India. He is the son of D. K. Chowta, a Tulu author and businessman hailing from the Bunt community. His younger sister is ethnographer Prajna Chowta.

Filmography

Album Discography
 Matters of The Heart - Jazz Album
 The Immersive Experience - New Age EP
 Re-Enter the Dragon - Pop Single
 The Arrival - Progressive Rock Single
 From The Cinematic Vault Vol. 1 - New Age Album
 From The Cinematic Vault Vol. 2 - New Age Album
 From The Cinematic Vault Vol. 3 - New Age Album
 From The Cinematic Vault Vol. 4 - New Age Album
 From The Cinematic Vault Vol. 5 - New Age Album
 From The Cinematic Vault Vol. 6 - New Age Album
 From The Cinematic Vault Vol. 7 - New Age Album
 From The Cinematic Vault Vol. 8 - New Age Album
 From The Cinematic Vault Vol. 9 - New Age Album
 Boom / The Lost Files - New Age Album
 Chalk & Cheeze - Electronic Dance Music Album
 560001 by Peepal Tree & Sandeep Chowta - Kannada Pop/Rock Album
 Re-Laxman Vol. 1 by Tony Das & Sandeep Chowta - Lounge/Pop/Easy Listening Music Album
 Re-Laxman Vol. 2 by Tony Das & Sandeep Chowta - Lounge/Pop/Easy Listening Music Album
 Venu - Carnatic Classical Fusion Music Album
 Mallika I Hate You - Hindi Album
Mitti- Hindi Album
Now That's Sandeep Chowta- Hindi Album
Alisha Alisha- Hindi Album
Viva - Hindi Album
Mila- Hindi Album

Band/Ensemble Discography
 Aomusic – Twirl 2009 (contributing producer)
 Aomusic – ...and Love Rages on! 2011 (contributing producer)
 Aomusic – Hokulea 2013 (contributing producer)

References

Further reading
 Mosic: Cover Story: Sandep Chowta
 Sandeep Chowta on Yahoo Movies
 A Chit Chat with Sandeep Chowta

External links
 Official Site
 

20th-century Indian male singers
20th-century Indian singers
Telugu playback singers
Kannada film score composers
Mangaloreans
Living people
Musicians from Bangalore
Filmfare Awards winners
Hindi film score composers
Indian expatriates in Ghana
Indian expatriates in Nigeria
Year of birth missing (living people)
Male film score composers